John River may refer to:

John River (Alaska), a river
John River (rapper), Canadian rapper
John River, the titular detective played by Stellan Skarsgård in the BBC One and Netflix 6-part miniseries River (2016)

See also
Johns River (disambiguation)
Saint John River (disambiguation)